The Page playoff system is a playoff format used primarily in softball and curling at the championship level, the Indian Premier League and Pakistan Super League cricket tournaments.  Teams are seeded using a round-robin tournament and the top four play a mix of a single-elimination and double-elimination tournament to determine the winner. It is identical to a four-team McIntyre system playoff, first used by the WANFL, SANFL and VFL in Australia in 1931, originally called the Page–McIntyre system, after the VFL delegate, the Richmond Football Club's Secretary, Percy "Pip" Page, who had advocated its use.

History
The Page playoff system was used at the Australian Rugby League Championship 1954–1972. In Australia, its most notable use today is in netball, having been adopted by Suncorp Super Netball when it began play in 2017.

The system has been used since 1990 by the International Softball Federation and its successor, the World Baseball Softball Confederation, for the Women's Softball World Championship and from 1996 to 2008 at the Olympic Games.

Its first use in curling was by the Canadian Curling Association in the 1995 Labatt Brier, the men's championship, and was adopted the next year at the 1996 Scott Tournament of Hearts, the women's championship.  It gained acceptance and in 2005 the World Curling Championships started using it until 2018 when the playoff format was switched to re-seeding 6 team single-elimination. It has not yet been adopted in curling at the Olympic Games.

The format is used in the Indian Premier League cricket tournament since 2011.

The format has also been used in some much lower-key, internet gaming events, such as chess and backgammon.

Beginning with the 2020 season, the League of Legends Championship Series uses a double-elimination format with a Page playoff system being employed for the final rounds of the playoff tournament. A similar format would also be adopted for the League of Legends European Championship that same year. 

The 2021 playoffs saw the National Basketball Association use the system for its Play-In Tournament. It featured teams ranked 7th–10th in their respective conferences during the regular season. The winner of the 7–8 game advanced to the playoffs as the seventh seed, while the loser played in the preliminary final game against the winner of the 9–10 game for the eighth seed. This meant the 7th and 8th place teams have two chances to win once, while the 9th and 10th place teams needed to win back-to-back games.
The League of Legends Pro League also uses the same system to determine its final two World Championship berths since 2020, followed by League of Legends Champions Korea since 2022.

Format
The system requires teams to be ranked in some way, as the top two teams have an advantage over the bottom two.  This is usually accomplished through a round-robin tournament, which eliminates all but the top four teams.

Round-robin
A standard round-robin tournament is used, in which all teams play each other once.  Because the number of total games increases quadratically with respect to the number of teams, scheduling too many teams will result in an unwieldy number of games, particularly when there are a limited number of playing surfaces (championship curling arenas usually only have four or five sheets).  Therefore, the number of teams is usually capped at around a dozen; if this is not possible or desirable, teams may be separated into groups playing separate round-robins and either having the top teams combining for the Page playoff or playing separate ones in each group and having the winners play each other after.

Page playoff system
The system was invented in Australia in the early 1930s and adopted soon after by the Victorian Football League (now known as the Australian Football League). The top four teams advance to the playoffs, which are played over three rounds with one team being eliminated in each round.

The format progresses as follows:
In Game 1, the third- and fourth-placed teams play against each other. The loser is eliminated.
In Game 2, the first- and second-placed teams play against each other. The winner qualifies directly for the final.
In Game 3, the winner of Game 1 plays against the loser of Game 2. The loser is eliminated.
Game 4 (the final) is then played between the winners of Games 2 and 3.

This system gives the top two teams a double chance, in that they can lose their first game and still go on to win the title, producing a similar though not identical effect to a double-elimination tournament.  This gives the top two teams a significant advantage over the next two, since winning the title from third or fourth place requires winning one more game than winning from first or second, and also requires defeating every other team in the playoffs. Additionally, the higher-ranked team in any pairing (which, in the final, is automatically the team that won Game 2) will play as the home team to provide an additional advantage; in the case of curling teams, where teams rarely play national or international tournaments at their home rink, the advantage is that the first-placed team is given the hammer (last rock) in the first end, which is a reasonable advantage between comparably skilled teams.

In the 2008 World Women's Curling Championship, a fifth match was added to the format: a bronze medal playoff match, which was played between the two teams which did not qualify for the final (the losers of Games 1 and 3). This game is normally scheduled between Games 3 and 4. Previously, the bronze would have automatically been awarded to the team which lost Game 3, so this game provides a chance for the loser of Game 1 to still receive a medal. This was also introduced at the national level at the 2011 Scotties Tournament of Hearts and the 2011 Tim Hortons Brier. The bronze medal game was heavily criticized for being "meaningless" in part because simply winning a "medal" does not carry the same sort of prestige it does in the Olympic Games. The bronze medal game was eliminated prior to the 2018 Canadian championship curling season.

Names of matches
In Australia, Games 1 and 2 are known as Semi-Finals; Game 3 is called the Preliminary Final, and the final is known as the Grand Final. To distinguish between the two Semi-Finals, which are different in nature, the match between 3rd and 4th is known either as the First semi-final or the Minor Semi-Final; and the match between 1st and 2nd is known either as the Second semi-final or the Major Semi-Final.

In Curling, Games 1 and 2 are usually known as the 3-4 game and 1-2 game, respectively (and Game 2 is usually played first, to give the higher-ranked team more rest before Game 3); Game 3 is called the Semi-Final, and the final is known by that name.

In India, Game 1 is known as the Eliminator, Games 2 and 3 are called Qualifiers 1 and 2 respectively, and the final is known by that name.

In China's LPL, Game 2 is known as the Winner's Bracket, while Game 1 and Game 3 are respectively called Loser's Bracket first round and Loser's Bracket final. There is no real final, the winner of Game 2 would be the 3rd seed of LPL in the Worlds, while the winner of Game 3 is seeded as 4th and have to enter the play-in round.

Examples
1931 Victorian Football League playoffs

The first-ever use of the system was in Australia in 1931 after the Victorian Football League adopted it.  The regular season ended with Geelong winning the minor premiership, followed by Richmond, Carlton and Collingwood.  The finals proceeded as follows:

Page playoff, including a bronze medal match, from the 2011 Scotties Tournament of Hearts.

Reaction
Players and fans alike have had a mixed reaction to the system.  Broadcasters enjoy it as it produces one more game than the single-elimination format.

See also
 AFL finals series
 NBA Play-In Tournament
 Page–McIntyre system

References

Curling terminology
Sports terminology
Tournament systems
Softball